The 2018–19 FC Schalke 04 season was the 115th season in the football club's history and 28th consecutive and 51st overall season in the top flight of German football, the Bundesliga, having been promoted from the 2. Bundesliga in 1991. In addition to the domestic league, Schalke 04 also were participating in this season's editions of the domestic cup, the DFB-Pokal, and the first-tier continental cup, the UEFA Champions League. This was the 18th season for Schalke in the Veltins-Arena, located in Gelsenkirchen, North Rhine-Westphalia. The season covered a period from 1 July 2018 to 30 June 2019.

Players

Squad information

Transfers

In

Out

Club

Kit
Supplier: Umbro / Sponsor: Gazprom

Friendly matches

Competitions

Overview

Bundesliga

League table

Results summary

Matches

DFB-Pokal

UEFA Champions League

Group stage

Knockout phase

Round of 16

Statistics

Squad statistics
{|class="wikitable sortable nowrap" style=text-align:center
|-
!rowspan=2|No||rowspan="2"|Nat||rowspan=2|Player||rowspan="2"|Age||rowspan="2" style="border-right: 1pt black solid"|Contractends||colspan="5" style="border-right: 1pt black solid"|Total||colspan="5" style="border-right: 1pt black solid"|Bundesliga||colspan="5" style="border-right: 1pt black solid"|DFB-Pokal||colspan="5"|Champions League
|-
!||class="unsortable"|||||||style="border-right: 1pt black solid"|||||class="unsortable"|||||||style="border-right: 1pt black solid"|||||class="unsortable"|||||||style="border-right: 1pt black solid"|||||class="unsortable"|||||||
|- class="sortbottom" style="background:#DCDCDC"
| colspan="25" | Goalkeepers
|- style="background:#A9D0F5"
|1||||align="left"| (C)||||style="border-right: 1pt black solid"|30.06.2022
|25||24||0||0||style="border-right: 1pt black solid"|0
|17||16||0||0||style="border-right: 1pt black solid"|0
|2||2||0||0||style="border-right: 1pt black solid"|0
|6||6||0||0||0
|- style="background:#A9D0F5"
|34||||align="left"|||||style="border-right: 1pt black solid"|30.06.2021
|0||0||0||0||style="border-right: 1pt black solid"|0
|0||0||0||0||style="border-right: 1pt black solid"|0
|0||0||0||0||style="border-right: 1pt black solid"|0
|0||0||0||0||0
|- style="background:#A9D0F5"
|35||||align="left"|||||style="border-right: 1pt black solid"|30.06.2020
|22||22||0||1||style="border-right: 1pt black solid"|1
|18||18||0||1||style="border-right: 1pt black solid"|1
|2||2||0||0||style="border-right: 1pt black solid"|0
|2||2||0||0||0
|- class="sortbottom" style="background:#DCDCDC"
| colspan="25" | Defenders
|- style="background:#B9FFC5"
|3||||align="left"|||||style="border-right: 1pt black solid"|30.06.2023
|16||13||0||5||style="border-right: 1pt black solid"|0
|9||7||0||5||style="border-right: 1pt black solid"|0
|1||1||0||0||style="border-right: 1pt black solid"|0
|6||5||0||0||0
|- style="background:#B9FFC5"
|5||||align="left"|||||style="border-right: 1pt black solid"|30.06.2022
|37||37||1||7||style="border-right: 1pt black solid"|1
|28||28||1||6||style="border-right: 1pt black solid"|1
|3||3||0||1||style="border-right: 1pt black solid"|0
|6||6||0||0||0
|- style="background:#F2F2F2"
|14||||align="left"|||||style="border-right: 1pt black solid"|
|4||3||0||0||style="border-right: 1pt black solid"|0
|2||2||0||0||style="border-right: 1pt black solid"|0
|1||1||0||0||style="border-right: 1pt black solid"|0
|1||0||0||0||0
|- style="background:#B9FFC5"
|17||||align="left"|||||style="border-right: 1pt black solid"|30.06.2020
|27||26||0||5||style="border-right: 1pt black solid"|0
|21||20||0||3||style="border-right: 1pt black solid"|0
|1||1||0||0||style="border-right: 1pt black solid"|0
|5||5||0||2||0
|- style="background:#B9FFC5"
|21||||align="left"|||||style="border-right: 1pt black solid"|30.06.2019
|1||0||0||0||style="border-right: 1pt black solid"|0
|1||0||0||0||style="border-right: 1pt black solid"|0
|0||0||0||0||style="border-right: 1pt black solid"|0
|0||0||0||0||0
|- style="background:#B9FFC5"
|24||||align="left"|||||style="border-right: 1pt black solid"|30.06.2020
|25||25||1||3||style="border-right: 1pt black solid"|0
|21||21||1||3||style="border-right: 1pt black solid"|0
|2||2||0||0||style="border-right: 1pt black solid"|0
|2||2||0||0||0
|- style="background:#B9FFC5"
|26||||align="left"|||||style="border-right: 1pt black solid"|30.06.2022
|40||39||4||6||style="border-right: 1pt black solid"|0
|30||29||2||4||style="border-right: 1pt black solid"|0
|4||4||2||1||style="border-right: 1pt black solid"|0
|6||6||0||1||0
|- style="background:#B9FFC5"
|27||||align="left"|||||style="border-right: 1pt black solid"|30.06.2019
|12||10||0||6||style="border-right: 1pt black solid"|0
|9||7||0||4||style="border-right: 1pt black solid"|0
|1||1||0||1||style="border-right: 1pt black solid"|0
|2||2||0||1||0
|- style="background:#F2F2F2"
|29||||align="left"|||||style="border-right: 1pt black solid"|
|13||13||0||1||style="border-right: 1pt black solid"|0
|7||7||0||1||style="border-right: 1pt black solid"|0
|2||2||0||0||style="border-right: 1pt black solid"|0
|4||4||0||0||0
|- style="background:#B9FFC5"
|42||||align="left"|||||style="border-right: 1pt black solid"|30.06.2022
|1||1||0||0||style="border-right: 1pt black solid"|0
|1||1||0||0||style="border-right: 1pt black solid"|0
|0||0||0||0||style="border-right: 1pt black solid"|0
|0||0||0||0||0
|- style="background:#B9FFC5"
|44||||align="left"|||||style="border-right: 1pt black solid"|30.06.2020
|1||1||0||0||style="border-right: 1pt black solid"|0
|1||1||0||0||style="border-right: 1pt black solid"|0
|0||0||0||0||style="border-right: 1pt black solid"|0
|0||0||0||0||0
|- class="sortbottom" style="background:#DCDCDC"
| colspan="25" | Midfielders
|- style="background:#FFEBAD"
|2||||align="left"|||||style="border-right: 1pt black solid"|30.06.2022
|33||25||2||7||style="border-right: 1pt black solid"|0
|24||19||1||6||style="border-right: 1pt black solid"|0
|3||2||0||0||style="border-right: 1pt black solid"|0
|6||4||1||1||0
|- style="background:#FFEBAD"
|6||||align="left"|||||style="border-right: 1pt black solid"|30.06.2022
|19||15||0||5||style="border-right: 1pt black solid"|0
|14||11||0||2||style="border-right: 1pt black solid"|0
|2||1||0||0||style="border-right: 1pt black solid"|0
|3||3||0||3||0
|- style="background:#FFEBAD"
|8||||align="left"|||||style="border-right: 1pt black solid"|30.06.2022
|35||27||2||4||style="border-right: 1pt black solid"|2
|26||20||2||3||style="border-right: 1pt black solid"|2
|2||2||0||0||style="border-right: 1pt black solid"|0
|7||5||0||1||0
|- style="background:#FFEBAD"
|10||||align="left"|||||style="border-right: 1pt black solid"|30.06.2021
|34||25||8||6||style="border-right: 1pt black solid"|0
|25||19||3||4||style="border-right: 1pt black solid"|0
|3||2||2||2||style="border-right: 1pt black solid"|0
|6||4||3||0||0
|- style="background:#FFEBAD"
|11||||align="left"|||||style="border-right: 1pt black solid"|30.06.2020
|21||13||1||0||style="border-right: 1pt black solid"|1
|13||7||1||0||style="border-right: 1pt black solid"|1
|2||1||0||0||style="border-right: 1pt black solid"|0
|6||5||0||0||0
|- style="background:#FFEBAD"
|13||||align="left"|||||style="border-right: 1pt black solid"|30.06.2022
|28||22||0||7||style="border-right: 1pt black solid"|0
|21||17||0||4||style="border-right: 1pt black solid"|0
|3||2||0||1||style="border-right: 1pt black solid"|0
|4||3||0||2||0
|- style="background:#F2F2F2"
|16||||align="left"|||||style="border-right: 1pt black solid"|
|0||0||0||0||style="border-right: 1pt black solid"|0
|0||0||0||0||style="border-right: 1pt black solid"|0
|0||0||0||0||style="border-right: 1pt black solid"|0
|0||0||0||0||0
|- style="background:#FFEBAD"
|18||||align="left"|||||style="border-right: 1pt black solid"|30.06.2020
|40||39||7||9||style="border-right: 1pt black solid"|0
|31||31||7||9||style="border-right: 1pt black solid"|0
|3||2||0||0||style="border-right: 1pt black solid"|0
|6||6||0||0||0
|- style="background:#FFEBAD"
|25||||align="left"|||||style="border-right: 1pt black solid"|30.06.2021
|25||15||1||1||style="border-right: 1pt black solid"|0
|18||12||1||1||style="border-right: 1pt black solid"|0
|2||2||0||0||style="border-right: 1pt black solid"|0
|5||1||0||0||0
|- style="background:#FFEBAD"
|28||||align="left"|||||style="border-right: 1pt black solid"|30.06.2021
|21||15||2||4||style="border-right: 1pt black solid"|0
|15||11||1||3||style="border-right: 1pt black solid"|0
|2||1||0||1||style="border-right: 1pt black solid"|0
|4||3||1||0||0
|- style="background:#FFEBAD"
|39||||align="left"|||||style="border-right: 1pt black solid"|30.06.2019
|1||1||0||1||style="border-right: 1pt black solid"|0
|0||0||0||0||style="border-right: 1pt black solid"|0
|0||0||0||0||style="border-right: 1pt black solid"|0
|1||1||0||1||0
|- style="background:#FFEBAD"
|41||||align="left"|||||style="border-right: 1pt black solid"|30.06.2022
|8||5||0||0||style="border-right: 1pt black solid"|0
|7||4||0||0||style="border-right: 1pt black solid"|0
|1||1||0||0||style="border-right: 1pt black solid"|0
|0||0||0||0||0
|- class="sortbottom" style="background:#DCDCDC"
| colspan="25" | Forwards
|- style="background:#FFCBCB"
|7||||align="left"|||||style="border-right: 1pt black solid"|30.06.2022
|29||23||4||6||style="border-right: 1pt black solid"|0
|20||15||2||3||style="border-right: 1pt black solid"|0
|4||3||1||1||style="border-right: 1pt black solid"|0
|5||5||1||2||0
|- style="background:#F2F2F2"
|9||||align="left"|||||style="border-right: 1pt black solid"|
|5||4||0||0||style="border-right: 1pt black solid"|0
|4||3||0||0||style="border-right: 1pt black solid"|0
|0||0||0||0||style="border-right: 1pt black solid"|0
|1||1||0||0||0
|- style="background:#FFCBCB"
|14||||align="left"|||||style="border-right: 1pt black solid"|30.06.2023
|8||2||0||0||style="border-right: 1pt black solid"|0
|7||1||0||0||style="border-right: 1pt black solid"|0
|1||1||0||0||style="border-right: 1pt black solid"|0
|0||0||0||0||0
|- style="background:#FFCBCB"
|15||||align="left"|||||style="border-right: 1pt black solid"|30.06.2022
|16||4||3||1||style="border-right: 1pt black solid"|0
|13||3||2||0||style="border-right: 1pt black solid"|0
|2||1||1||1||style="border-right: 1pt black solid"|0
|1||0||0||0||0
|- style="background:#FFCBCB"
|19||||align="left"|||||style="border-right: 1pt black solid"|30.06.2022
|33||22||5||5||style="border-right: 1pt black solid"|0
|24||17||4||4||style="border-right: 1pt black solid"|0
|3||3||0||1||style="border-right: 1pt black solid"|0
|6||2||1||0||0
|- style="background:#FFCBCB"
|22||||align="left"|||||style="border-right: 1pt black solid"|30.06.2021
|16||9||3||1||style="border-right: 1pt black solid"|0
|12||8||3||1||style="border-right: 1pt black solid"|0
|0||0||0||0||style="border-right: 1pt black solid"|0
|4||1||0||0||0
|- style="background:#FFCBCB"
|23||||align="left"|||||style="border-right: 1pt black solid"|30.06.2021
|9||3||0||0||style="border-right: 1pt black solid"|0
|5||2||0||0||style="border-right: 1pt black solid"|0
|2||0||0||0||style="border-right: 1pt black solid"|0
|2||1||0||0||0
|- style="background:#FFCBCB"
|36||||align="left"|||||style="border-right: 1pt black solid"|30.06.2021
|28||21||6||6||style="border-right: 1pt black solid"|0
|20||15||5||4||style="border-right: 1pt black solid"|0
|3||1||0||0||style="border-right: 1pt black solid"|0
|5||5||1||2||0
|- style="background:#FFCBCB"
|40||||align="left"|||||style="border-right: 1pt black solid"|30.06.2020
|7||2||1||0||style="border-right: 1pt black solid"|0
|7||2||1||0||style="border-right: 1pt black solid"|0
|0||0||0||0||style="border-right: 1pt black solid"|0
|0||0||0||0||0
|- class="sortbottom" align="center" style="background:#DCDCDC"
|colspan="5" style="border-right: 1pt black solid"|Total|colspan="2"|46||51||97||style="border-right: 1pt black solid"|5
|colspan="2"|34||37||71||style="border-right: 1pt black solid"|5
|colspan="2"|4||6||10||style="border-right: 1pt black solid"|0
|colspan="2"|8||8'||16||0
|}Players in grey left the club during the season.''

Goalscorers

Clean sheets

References

FC Schalke 04 seasons
Schalke
Schalke